Jacob Engel (born 13 January 2001) is a German footballer who plays as a left-back for 1. FC Schweinfurt 05.

Career statistics

References

2001 births
Living people
People from Bad Kreuznach
German footballers
Footballers from Rhineland-Palatinate
Association football defenders
Regionalliga players
3. Liga players
TSV Schott Mainz players
1. FSV Mainz 05 players
Eintracht Frankfurt players
SC Freiburg players
SC Freiburg II players
1. FC Schweinfurt 05 players